The 1987 Camel GT Championship season was the 17th season of the IMSA GT Championship auto racing series.  It was for GTP and Lights classes of prototypes, as well as Grand Tourer-style racing cars which ran in the GTO and GTU classes.  It began January 31, 1987, and ended October 25, 1987, after 21 rounds.

Schedule
The GT and Prototype classes did not participate in all events, nor did they race together at shorter events.  Races marked as GT featured both GTO and GTU classes combined.  Races marked with All had all classes on track at the same time.

Season results

External links
 World Sports Racing Prototypes - 1987 IMSA GT Championship results

IMSA GT Championship seasons
IMSA GT